The E56 120 mm Mortar, is a Heavy Infantry mortar (referred to as such by its 120 mm payload, produced by the EAS (weapons) for the Hellenic Army.

See also 
 Soltam K6 
 Mortar 120mm M95 Long Range
 120 KRH 92
 Light mortar 120mm M75

References

120 mm artillery
Infantry mortars
Artillery of Greece
120mm mortars
Military equipment introduced in the 1980s